The 1993–94 Segunda División season saw 20 teams participate in the second flight Spanish league. RCD Español, Real Betis and SD Compostela were promoted to Primera División. CD Castellón, Real Murcia, Real Burgos and Cádiz CF were relegated to Segunda División B.

Teams

Teams by Autonomous Community

Final table

Results

Promotion playoff

Tiebreak

First Leg

Second Leg

Tiebreak

Segunda División seasons
2
Spain